Jonesiaceae is a family of Actinomycetota.

References

Micrococcales
Soil biology